Tetele is a village in Cena Parish, Jelgava Municipality in the Semigallia region of Latvia. The village is located on the Lielupe river approximately 39 km from the capital Riga and 8 km from the city of Jelgava.

References

Towns and villages in Latvia
Jelgava Municipality
Doblen County
Semigallia